AGEOD's American Civil War: 1861-1865 - The Blue and the Gray is a historical operational turn-based strategy video game that places players at the head of the United States or Confederate States during the American Civil War (1861–1865).

Players are military and political leaders trying to lead the troops of their nations (armies and fleets) to victory, while making political and economical/financial decisions throughout the game that affect the outcome.

Most of the individual years of campaign between 1861 and 1865 are playable via a separate scenario. Advanced scenarios allow recreation of yearly and/or theater campaigns.

Virtual Programming published the Mac OS X version of the game on April 8, 2011.

Reception

The game received "mixed" reviews according to the review aggregation website Metacritic.

Sequel
A sequel, titled Civil War II, was developed by AGEod and published by Slitherine Software. Developed to commemorate the 150th anniversary of the American Civil War, it was released in 2013. The developers partnered with the Civil War Trust, and a portion of proceeds from the sale of the game was donated to the trust.

References

External links
Official website

2007 video games
AGEod games
American Civil War video games
Grand strategy video games
MacOS games
Turn-based tactics video games
Video games developed in France
Windows games
Multiplayer and single-player video games
Take-Two Interactive games
Ascaron games
Matrix Games games